The 1998–99 Miami RedHawks men's basketball team represent Miami University in the 1998–99 NCAA Division I men's basketball season. The RedHawks, led by 3rd-year head coach Charlie Coles, played their home games at Millett Hall in Oxford, Ohio as members of the Mid-American Conference. The team finished atop the conference regular season standings and, despite falling in the championship game of the MAC tournament, earned an at-large bid to the NCAA tournament. As the No. 10 seed in the Midwest region, Miami defeated Washington and Utah to reach the Sweet Sixteen. The run came to and end in the Regional semifinals as the RedHawks fell to Kentucky, 58–43, to finish 24–8 (15–3 MAC).

Roster

Schedule and results

|-
!colspan=9 style=| Regular season

|-
!colspan=9 style=| MAC tournament

|-
!colspan=9 style=| NCAA tournament

Source

Rankings

1999 NBA draft

Awards and honors
Wally Szczerbiak – MAC Player of the Year, Consensus Second-Team All-American

References

Miami RedHawks men's basketball seasons
Miami (OH)
Miami (OH)